Scotorythra kuschei is a moth of the family Geometridae. It was first described by Otto Herman Swezey in 1940. It is endemic to the Hawaiian island of Kauai.

External links

K
Endemic moths of Hawaii
Biota of Kauai